Khlong Toei (also Klong Toey) is a district in central Bangkok, long known for its slum. It is bordered by the Chao Phraya River and contains major port facilities. It is also the site of a major market, the Khlong Toei Market.

Neighboring districts are (clockwise from the north): Watthana, Phra Khanong, Phra Pradaeng district of Samut Prakan province (across the Chao Phraya), Yan Nawa, Sathon, and Pathum Wan.

History

The area has a history dating back to the ninth century as a port to cities upstream along the Chao Phraya River, such as Pak Nam Phra Pradaeng (Thai: เมืองปากน้ำพระประแดง) (as opposed to the current Phra Pradaeng district) built during the King Phutthayotfa Chulalok period.

Khlong Thanon Trong (Thai: คลองถนนตรง) was a khlong (canal) and a parallel road built by King Mongkut around 1857. Later, different sections of the canal became known as Khlong Toei and Khlong Hua Lamphong. Khlong Toei means 'the canal of pandan', as the plant grew along the southern bank of the canal. The road was renamed Rama IV Road by King Vajiravudh in 1919. In 1947, a large portion of Khlong Toei canal was filled to expand the Rama IV Road surface.

The area was once part of the Phra Khanong district, but on 9 November 1989 it was separated to form the new Khlong Toei District. Originally Khlong Toei consisted of six sub-districts, three of which later formed the new Watthana district (announced on 14 October 1997, effective 6 March 1998).

The squatted informal settlement was surveyed in 1971 and is one of the largest slums in Bangkok. In 2006, it was estimated that between 80,000 and 100,000 people live there.

Administration

The district is divided into three subdistricts (khwaeng). From west to east, these are:

Khlong Toei is both the name of a subdistrict and the district in which it lies. Phra Khanong is both a subdistrict of Khlong Toei and a district on its own, with only subdistrict Bang Chak. Furthermore, all three subdistricts listed above have counterparts with the addition of "nuea" (north) in Watthana District.

Port
Khlong Toei Port, also known as Bangkok Port, was formerly Thailand's only major port for sea transportation of cargo. Its construction began in 1938 and finished after World War II. The port is on the Chao Phraya River, not far from the Gulf of Thailand. Due to its limited capacity and traffic problems caused by semi-trailer trucks, many of its operations have moved to Laem Chabang Port in Chonburi province since its opening in July 1981.

Places of interest

 Bangkok Planetarium
 Science Center for Education
 Tamnak Plai Noen, the historic residence of Prince Naris, now converted into a small museum.
 The Emporium, a luxury shopping center.
 Nana Plaza, a major adult entertainment center, known for prostitution and go-go and hostess bars.
 Queen Sirikit National Convention Center, served by the MRT station of the same name, hosts various exhibitions around the year. The venue will be closed for renovation following contract extension.
 Benjakitti Park, a public park next to the convention center. It includes a lake and is on land that was formerly occupied by the Tobacco Monopoly, the government's tobacco factory. 
 Benjasiri Park, a public park created to commemorate Her Majesty Queen Sirikit's 60th birthday. It is next to the Emporium.
Opened in December 2005, it is on Sukhumvit Soi 10.
 Khlong Toei Market, Bangkok's largest wet market.
 The Khlong Toei slum, south of the expressway and north of the port, is the largest and oldest slum of Bangkok. It houses some 100,000 people on about one square mile (260 ha) of land owned by the Port Authority.
 Metropolitan Electricity Authority
 The Customs Department
 PAT Stadium off Sunthon Kosa Road.
 Port Authority of Thailand and Bangkok Port
 Eastern Bus Terminal (Ekkamai)
 Tobacco Authority of Thailand (Formerly known as Thailand Tobacco Monopoly)

The following places of interest were formerly in Khlong Toei District:
 Lumpinee Boxing Stadium, an indoor Muay Thai arena, now moved to Ram Intra Road, Bang Khen District.
 Suan Lum Night Bazaar, closed due to contract expiry, now moved to Suan Lum Night Bazaar Ratchadaphisek.
 Stock Exchange of Thailand Building. Now the office is moved to Din Daeng district.

Diplomatic missions
 Embassy of Chile
 Embassy of Cuba
 Embassy of the Philippines
 Embassy of Romania
 Embassy of Spain
 Embassy of Sudan

Transportation
BTS skytrain (BTS) stations in the district include Nana, Asok (with interchange to MRT Sukhumvit station), Phrom Phong, Thong Lo, Ekkamai, Phra Khanong, and On Nut, respectively, all of which are located along Sukhumvit Road on the BTS Sukhumvit Line.
MRT (MRTA) has stations Khlong Toei, Queen Sirikit National Convention Center and Sukhumvit (interchange to BTS).
Eastern Bus Terminal (also called Ekkamai Bus Terminal) has intercity buses to destinations such as Pattaya, Rayong and Trat. It is on Sukhumvit Road, near the Ekkamai BTS station.

Economy

 The head office of Asia Atlantic Airlines is on the 11th floor of the Times Square Building in Khlong Toei District.
 The State Railway of Thailand (SRT) is a large landowner in Thailand. Its latest property development scheme is the Chao Phraya Gateway project, a mix of hotels, shopping centers, and condominiums. It capitalizes on SRT's 277 rai, 1.16 kilometer-long stretch of land on the river in the Khlong Toei District. The SRT hopes the project will help clear its 100 billion baht debt. The project is projected to break even within eight years and deliver profits of 140 billion baht. , SRT's plans are being submitted to the Transport Ministry for approval.

Education

The Sacred Heart Convent School is in Khlong Toei.

References

External links

BMA website with the tourist landmarks of Khlong Toei
Khlong Toei district office (Thai only)
History of Khlong Toei port

 
Districts of Bangkok
Poverty in Thailand
Slums in Thailand